Christine Beauchamp (born 1970) is an American businesswoman and fashion professional.

Career 
Beauchamp graduated from Harvard Business School with an MBA and holds an undergraduate Politics degree from Princeton University. After starting her career in 1992, as a financial analyst at Goldman Sachs, she worked for the Boston Consulting Group, and later served as president and CEO of Victoria's Secret from 2005 to 2008. Beauchamp later joined Ann, Inc. Initially serving as a consultant, she became Brand President of the Ann Taylor division in August 2008. Beauchamp left the company in 2012 to pursue other opportunities.

In September 2015, Beauchamp became the Global Brand President for Lauren and Chaps. In 2016, it was announced that she would be leaving her position with Lauren and Chaps.

In May 2017, Beauchamp was announced as the new president of Amazon Fashion, replacing former president Catherine Lewis-Beaudoin. In December 2019, she was one of two women promoted to Amazon’s senior leadership team.

Beauchamp was formerly a member of the board of directors of Step Up Women's Network and a member of the executive committee of Angel Vine VC.

References

1970s births
Living people
Amazon (company) people
American fashion businesspeople
American women chief executives
American financial analysts
American retail chief executives
Women corporate executives
Women financial analysts
Goldman Sachs people
Harvard Business School alumni
Princeton University alumni
21st-century American businesspeople
21st-century American women